The Top Flight Invitational Handicap is an American Thoroughbred horse race run annually at Aqueduct Racetrack in Queens, New York. A Listed race, it is open to fillies and mares, age three and older. The event is contested over a distance of one and one-eighth miles on dirt and currently offers a purse of $100,000.

The Top Flight Handicap was run at Belmont Park prior to 1961 and again in 1993. 

The race is named for Top Flight, ranked in the Blood-Horse magazine List of the Top 100 Racehorses of the 20th Century at #66. Top Flight was never beaten by a member of her own sex.

Historical note
Poker Night, the lone three-year-old in a field of seven, won the 1973 race by four lengths and bettered the stakes record time stakes two‐fifths of a second while running on a wet track officially rated only as good.

Records
Speed record: (at current distance of 1 mile)
 1:48.20 @ 1-1/8 miles: Poker Night (1973)
 1:41.80 @ 1-1/16 miles: Parlo (1955)
 1:34.96 @ 1 mile: Educated Risk (1994)

Most wins:
 2 - Amerigo Lady (1968, 1969)
 2 - Shuvee (1970, 1971)

Most wins by a jockey:
 6 - Jerry Bailey (1990, 1993, 2000, 2002, 2004, 2005)

Most wins by a trainer:
 4 - C. R. McGaughey III (1994, 2001, 2004, 2016)

Most wins by an owner:
 3 - Ethel D. Jacobs (1956, 1965, 1967)
 3 - Rokeby Stable (1968, 1969, 1993)

Winners

References

Listed stakes races in the United States
Horse races in New York (state)
Mile category horse races for fillies and mares
Recurring sporting events established in 1940
Aqueduct Racetrack
1940 establishments in New York (state)